Jan Joseph Godfried, Baron van Voorst tot Voorst Sr. (16 September 1846 – 17 January 1931) was a Dutch politician and lieutenant-general of the Dutch army.

He was a member of the RKSP and was President of the Senate between 1914 and 1929. He was preceded by Jan Elias Nicolaas Schimmelpenninck van der Oye and was succeeded by Willem Lodewijk de Vos van Steenwijk.

Decorations
Tot Voorst received the following decorations:
: Knight of the Order of Orange-Nassau 
: Knight Grand Cross of the Order of the Netherlands Lion 
: Officier of the French Légion d'honneur
: Knight of the Order of the Dannebrog
: Knight of the Order of the Crown (Prussia)
: Commander of the Order of the Crown of Italy
: Commander of the Order of Franz Joseph
: Commander of the Order of the Sword

References

1846 births
1931 deaths
Presidents of the Senate (Netherlands)
Members of the Senate (Netherlands)
Roman Catholic State Party politicians
20th-century Dutch politicians
Dutch Roman Catholics
Aide-de-camp to the Monarch of the Netherlands
Royal Netherlands Army generals
Royal Netherlands Army personnel
Barons of Voorst tot Voorst
People from Arnhem
Knights of the Order of Orange-Nassau
Officiers of the Légion d'honneur
Knights of the Order of the Dannebrog
Commanders of the Order of Franz Joseph
Recipients of the Order of the Sword